The Ecologist Union of Romania Party (Partidului Uniunea Ecologistă din România) was a short-lived political party in Romania, active between March and August 2012. It claimed to be a "civic-political structure striving to find the best solutions for the economic, social, and ecological problems" in Romania. In the run-up to the December 2012 parliamentary elections, it merged into the Ecologist Party of Romania.

References

Defunct political parties in Romania
Defunct green political parties
Political parties established in 2012
Political parties disestablished in 2012
2012 establishments in Romania